The Chinese Ambassador to Suriname is the official representative of the People's Republic of China to the Republic of Suriname.

List of representatives

See also
China–Suriname relations

References 

 
Suriname
China